Grouard was a provincial electoral district in Alberta mandated to return a single member to the Legislative Assembly of Alberta from 1913 to 1971.

History

Boundary history
Grouard was created from the southwest quarter of Athabasca in 1913, centred on the small community of Grouard. Its main population centres soon became High Prairie and Falher, containing a number of Franco-Albertan communities. Its boundaries saw minor adjustments throughout its history, but it retained a similar size and shape until abolished in 1971, with the northeast parts going to Lesser Slave Lake and the southwest parts becoming Smoky River.

Representation history

Grouard was one of the friendliest ridings for the Alberta Liberal Party, and in its 58-year history, never once voted out an incumbent MLA.

Incumbent Athabasca MLA Jean Côté decided to run in the new riding of Grouard when it was created in 1913, easily defeating his Conservative challenger. He won re-election twice, and was appointed to the Senate on the advice of Prime Minister Mackenzie King in 1923, vacating his seat.

The resulting by-election was won handily by another Liberal, Leonidas Giroux. He was re-elected three times, defending his seat even in 1935, which saw every other seat in rural Alberta swept up by the nascent Social Credit Party of William Aberhart. However, Giroux died in office the following year.

The by-election in fall 1936 was again won by a Liberal, Joseph Tremblay, who narrowly defeated his Social Credit rival. Tremblay won a razor-thin re-election in 1940, one of only two Liberal candidates across the province in that election, and decided to retire when the legislature was dissolved.

The Liberals did not field a single candidate in 1944. With Social Credit candidate William Fallow finally capturing Grouard for the government, this ended the longest streak for any party in Alberta's tumultuous early politics. Fallow also died in office in 1948, but no by-election was held, as a general election took place that year.

Social Credit won the riding for a second time, with John Wood gaining a comfortable victory on the second count. He resigned his post before the term finished, necessitating another by-election in 1951.

Liberal Joseph Desfosses narrowly won the riding back for his party, serving with the revived opposition party until he chose to retire in 1959.

Grouard's final MLA was Roy Ells, who sat with the governing Social Credit for three terms until the riding was abolished in 1971.

Election results

1910s

|}

|}
Following the convention at the time, Côté stood in a by-election upon being named to cabinet. However, since no other candidates contested it, he was acclaimed.

1920s

|}

|}

1930s

 

|}

|}

1940s

|-
!colspan=6|Second Count

|-
|
|colspan=2|No second preference
|align=right|548

|}
First-count swing is calculated from the 1936 by-election, while second-count swing reflects increase in vote share from the first count.

|}

|-
!colspan=6|Second Count

|-
|
|colspan=2|No second preference
|align=right|958

|}

1950s

|-
!colspan=6|Second Count

|-
|
|colspan=2|No second preference
|align=right|580

|}

|-
!colspan=6|Second Count

|-
|
|colspan=2|No second preference
|align=right|284

|}

|}

1960s

|}

|}

Plebiscite results

1957 liquor plebiscite

On October 30, 1957 a stand alone plebiscite was held province wide in all 50 of the then current provincial electoral districts in Alberta. The government decided to consult Alberta voters to decide on liquor sales and mixed drinking after a divisive debate in the legislature. The plebiscite was intended to deal with the growing demand for reforming antiquated liquor control laws.

The plebiscite was conducted in two parts. Question A, asked in all districts, asked the voters if the sale of liquor should be expanded in Alberta, while Question B, asked in a handful of districts within the corporate limits of Calgary and Edmonton, asked if men and women should be allowed to drink together in establishments.

Province wide Question A of the plebiscite passed in 33 of the 50 districts while Question B passed in all five districts. Grouard voted in favour of the proposal with a landslide majority. Voter turnout in the district was the lowest in the province, at half the province wide average of 46%.

Official district returns were released to the public on December 31, 1957. The Social Credit government in power at the time did not consider the results binding. However the results of the vote led the government to repeal all existing liquor legislation and introduce an entirely new Liquor Act.

Municipal districts lying inside electoral districts that voted against the plebiscite were designated Local Option Zones by the Alberta Liquor Control Board and considered effective dry zones. Business owners who wanted a license had to petition for a binding municipal plebiscite in order to be granted a license.

References

Further reading

External links
Elections Alberta
The Legislative Assembly of Alberta

Former provincial electoral districts of Alberta